Talhah Yunus (born 21 October 1996) is a Pakistani rapper, filmmaker and musician. He graduated from the National College of Arts in filmmaking. He is a part of the hip hop duo Young Stunners along with Talha Anjum, having the music producer Jokhay. He was born and raised in Karachi. He appeared in the PSL Anthem of 2021 "Groove Mera".

Discography

Albums and mixtapes

Singles 
This section contains singles released by Talhah Yunus, or tracks he is featured on. For singles released by Young Stunners (with Talha Anjum), see Young Stunners' discography.
 Rooh Bohemia Remix – Young Stunners
 Full Pachaas – Young Stunners
 Battle in Style – Young Stunners
 Garmi – Talhah Yunus
 Pound Cake Remix – Talhah Yunus

References

External links 

1996 births
Pakistani rappers
Living people